Menashe is a surname. Notable people with the surname include:

Ari Ben-Menashe (born 1951), Iranian-born Israeli businessman
Carmela Menashe (born 1949), Israeli journalist
Doron Menashe, Israeli academic and lawyer
Eden Ben Menashe (born 1995), Israeli footballer
Oded Menashe (born 1969), Israeli actor, magician and television presenter
Samuel Menashe (1925–2011), American poet
Shalev Menashe (born 1982), Israeli footballer